Amara District (Arabic: حي عمارة) is a district of the Maysan Governorate, Iraq. 

The population of Amara District is currently around 1,250,000 people.

Amarah is located inside of Amara District and is the capital and largest city of the Maysan Governorate. The population of the city is 
511,542 and is the 7th largest city in Iraq by population. 

Districts of Maysan Province